The United States District Court for the Western District of Pennsylvania (in case citations, W.D. Pa.) is a federal trial court that sits in Pittsburgh, Erie, and Johnstown, Pennsylvania. It is composed of ten judges as authorized by federal law. Appeals from this court are heard by the United States Court of Appeals for the Third Circuit (except for patent claims and claims against the U.S. government under the Tucker Act, which are appealed to the Federal Circuit).

History 

The United States District Court for the District of Pennsylvania was one of the original 13 courts established by the Judiciary Act of 1789, on September 24, 1789. The court began its first session on December 7, 1818 at the Old County Courthouse in Pittsburgh. Portions of these districts were subsequently subdivided into the Middle District on March 2, 1901, by 31 Stat. 880. At the time of its initial subdivision, presiding judge Richard Peters Jr. was reassigned to only the Eastern District. This made it possible for President James Monroe to appoint Jonathan Hoge Walker as the first judge of the Western District of Pennsylvania.

The Erie courthouse and division was split from Pittsburgh for initial actions in January 1867, with the Johnstown courthouse and division being split from Pittsburgh for initial actions in 1989.

Current judges 

:

Former judges

Chief judges

Succession of seats

United States Attorneys 
Former United States Attorneys for the district have included:
James Hamilton	          March 11, 1801
Andrew Stewart	          April 20, 1818
Alexander Brackenridge	          March 3, 1821
George W. Buchanan	          October 22, 1830
Benjamin Patton, Jr.	          October 22, 1832
John P. Anderson	          June 12, 1839
Cornelius Darragh	          March 25, 1841
William O'Hara Robinson	          March 29, 1844
John L. Dawson	          July 22, 1845
J. Bowman Sweitzer	          August 27, 1850
Charles Shaler	          April 19, 1853
Richard Biddle Roberts	          April 21, 1857
Robert B. Carnahan	          April 12, 1861
Henry B. Swope	          January 24, 1870
David Reed	          March 24, 1874
Henry H. McCormick	          June 29, 1876
William A. Stone	          July 6, 1880
George A. Allen	          December 4, 1886
Walter Lyon          June 21, 1889
Stephen C. McCandless	          April 26, 1893
Harry Alvan Hall	          June 8, 1893
B. Heiner	          September 14, 1897
James S. Young	          February 10, 1902
John W. Dunkle	          March 17, 1905
John H. Jordan	          April 15, 1909
Edwin Lowry Humes	          September 10, 1913
R. Lindsay Crawford	          September 2, 1918
Edwin Lowry Humes	          August 20, 1919
Robert J. Dodds	          June 1, 1920
D. J. Driscoll	          August 19, 1920
Walter Lyon	          March 11, 1921
John D. Meyer	          July 18, 1925
Louis Edward Graham	          October 31, 1929
Horatio S. Dumbauld	          August 17, 1933
Charles F. Uhl	          May 12, 1941
Owen McIntosh Burns	          May 16, 1947
Edward C. Boyle	          November 3, 1949
John W. McIlvaine	          July 16, 1953
D. Malcolm Anderson, Jr.	          August 19, 1955
Hubert I. Teitelbaum	          March 17, 1958
Joseph S. Ammerman	          June 5, 1961
Gustave Diamond	          February 2, 1963
Richard L. Thornburgh	          June 4, 1969
Blair A. Griffith	          July 7, 1975
Robert J. Cindrich	          September 29, 1978
J. Alan Johnson	          July 31, 1981
Charles D. Sheehy	          January 15, 1989
Thomas W. Corbett	          November 30, 1989
Frederick W. Thieman          August 16, 1993
Linda L. Kelly	          August 1, 1997
Harry Litman         October 22, 1998
Linda L. Kelly	          April 28, 2001
Mary Beth Buchanan –         September 18, 2001
Robert S. Cessar –	          November 17, 2009
David J. Hickton – August 12, 2010
Soo C. Song (acting) – November 29, 2016
Scott Brady – December 22, 2017
Cindy Chung – November 2021
Tony Rivetti (acting) February 17, 2023

See also 
 Courts of Pennsylvania
 List of current United States district judges
 List of United States federal courthouses in Pennsylvania

References

External links 
 Official site

1818 establishments in Pennsylvania
Pennsylvania, Western District
Pennsylvania law
Erie, Pennsylvania
Johnstown, Pennsylvania
Pittsburgh
Courthouses in Pennsylvania
Courts and tribunals established in 1818